Bird Branch is a stream in Benton County in the U.S. state of Missouri. It is a tributary of Duran Creek.

Bird Branch owes its name to the Bird family of settlers.

See also
List of rivers of Missouri

References

Rivers of Benton County, Missouri
Rivers of Missouri